Duke Calhoun (born September 1, 1987) is a former American football wide receiver. He played college football at the University of Memphis. He was signed by the New York Giants as an undrafted free agent in the 2010 offseason and was waived by the Giants in the 2011 offseason. He signed with Oakland in April 2012.

Early years 
Calhoun attended Raleigh Egypt High School in the Raleigh section of Memphis.

College career 
Calhoun holds the Memphis school record with 10 career 100-yard games. Ranks second all-time in career yards with 2,981 moving ahead of Earnest Gray's 2,123 yards. Ranks second all-time receptions. He caught 19 touchdowns in his Memphis career which at the time tied the record for second place all time at Memphis. Finished his career with a school record 49-game receiving streak, which ranked third nationally. He was voted the team's Most Valuable Player in 2009.

Professional career

Statistics
Source:

References

External links
New York Giants biography
Memphis Tigers biography

1987 births
Living people
Players of American football from Memphis, Tennessee
American football wide receivers
Memphis Tigers football players
New York Giants players
Oakland Raiders players